Ronan is the self-titled debut solo album by Irish singer-songwriter and Boyzone frontman, Ronan Keating. It was released by Polydor Records on 31 July 2000, and became a commercial success.

The album produced four UK and Irish top-ten singles: "When You Say Nothing at All", originally recorded for the soundtrack of the 1999 film Notting Hill, "Life Is a Rollercoaster", "The Way You Make Me Feel", and "Lovin' Each Day", the latter of which was featured on the re-release edition of the album, and later on Keating's second album, Destination.

Reception
The album was given several negative reviews; however, it sold over 750,000 copies and became one of the top selling albums of the year in the United Kingdom. It debuted at number one on the UK Albums Chart, and has been certified four-times platinum by the British Phonographic Industry for sales of 1.2 million copies. In the singer's native Ireland, the album debuted at number two. The album also became a commercial success in other European countries, where it charted within the top ten of eight countries. In 2001, Ronan was certified two-times platinum by the International Federation of the Phonographic Industry for shipments of two million copies inside Europe.

Track listing

Charts

Charts

Year-end

Certifications

References

2000 debut albums
Ronan Keating albums
Albums produced by Rick Nowels
Albums produced by Stephen Lipson
Albums produced by Patrick Leonard